The 2014–15 Detroit Red Wings season was the 89th season for the National Hockey League (NHL) franchise that was established on September 25, 1926.

Off-season
On May 23, 2014, it was announced that restricted free agent centre Cory Emmerton had signed with HC Sochi of the Kontinental Hockey League (KHL) for the 2014–15 season.

On June 19, 2014, former Red Wings assistant coach, Bill Peters, was hired as the new head coach of the Carolina Hurricanes. On July 15, 2014, the Red Wings hired Tony Granato as an assistant coach. On July 30, 2014, the Red Wings hired Jim Hiller and Andrew Brewer as assistant coaches.

On August 14, 2014, the Red Wings signed executive vice president and general manager Ken Holland to a four-year contract extension through the end of the 2017–18 season.

Standings

Schedule and results

Pre-season

Regular season

Playoffs

Player statistics
Skaters

Goaltenders

Goaltenders

†Denotes player spent time with another team before joining the Red Wings. Stats reflect time with the Red Wings only.
‡Traded mid-season
Bold/italics denotes franchise record

Notable achievements

Awards

Milestones

Transactions
The Red Wings have been involved in the following transactions during the 2014–15 season:

Trades

Free agents acquired

Free agents lost 

|-

Lost via waivers

Player signings

Suspensions/fines

Draft picks

The 2014 NHL Entry Draft was held on June 27–28, 2014 at the Wells Fargo Center in Philadelphia, Pennsylvania.

Draft notes
Detroit's second-round pick will go to the Nashville Predators, as the result of a trade on March 5, 2014, that sent David Legwand to Detroit, in exchange for Patrick Eaves, Calle Jarnkrok, and this pick (being conditional at the time of the trade). The condition – Nashville will receive a second-round pick in 2014 if Detroit qualifies for the 2014 Stanley Cup playoffs – was converted on April 9, 2014.
San Jose's seventh-round pick will go to Detroit, as the result of a trade on June 10, 2012, that sent Brad Stuart to San Jose, in exchange for Andrew Murray and this pick (being conditional at the time of the trade). The condition – Stuart is re-signed by San Jose for the 2012–13 season – was converted on June 18, 2012.

References

Detroit Red Wings seasons
Detroit Red Wings season, 2014-15
Detroit
Detroit Red
Detroit Red